Anirban Bhattacharya (born 7 October 1986) is an Indian actor, theatre actor, singer and director. His first successful theatre production was Debi Sarpamasta, written by Manoj Mitra, directed by Debesh Chattopadhyay. His other notable works are Anthony Soudamini, Nagamandala (famous play by Girish Karnad), Jara Agun Lagay, Bisorjan, FM Mahanagar, Karu Basana, Awdyo Shesh Rajani, Athoi etc. In 2017, he got the Mahindra Excellence Theatre Awards (META) as Best Actor in a Leading Role (Male) for Awdyo Shesh Rajani. In 2015, he started his film career with the Zee Bangla telefilm Kader Kuler Bou. He got fame for his character as Bishan Roy from the film Eagoler Chokh. For playing this role, he was picked up as  the Filmfare Awards East for Best Actor in a Supporting Role in 2017. In 2019, He got his first Best Actor Award for the role of Nikhilesh Chowdhury from the movie Ghawre Bairey Aaj which was immensely praised by critics and audiences. He made his directorial debut through the Bengali crime drama web series Mandaar, which is inspired by William Shakespeare's Macbeth. His second direction Ballavpurer Roopkotha was released on 21 October 2022.

Calcutta Times has voted him as one of the top 10 Most Desirable Men in 2017.

Early life
Anirban Bhattacharya was born on 7 October 1986 in Midnapore, West Bengal. He did his schooling from Nirmal Hriday Ashram Catholic Church High School in Midnapore. After that, in 2004 he moved to Kolkata to study theatre from Rabindra Bharati University. He completed his Master's in drama and received the Young Artist Scholarship in 2009 from the cultural ministry of the Government of India.

Theatre

He acted in various theater productions between 2005 and 2010. In 2008, Bhattacharya acted in the workshop based theatre production Jhunki (The Risk), conducted by Steve Clorfiene, student of Yergi Grotowski. It was a collaboration of American Council and Rabindra Bharati University. He acted in three productions like Raja Lear, Debi Sarpomosta and Chandragupta. He resigned from Minerva Repertoire in January 2013 and started his career as a professional freelance theatre actor.

Direction
In 2010, he formed his theatre group, Sangharam Hatibagan. He directed Guru, Chowmatha, Udorniti (a short play translated from the play Out At Sea by Slawomir Mrozek ), Pontu Laha 2.0 (an adaptation of the play Mr Puntila and his Man Matti by Bertolt Brecht ), and Mondar (an adaptation of William Shakespeare's Macbeth). In 2022 he directed bengali movie Ballavpurer Rupkotha which was an adaption of a play of same name, created by legendary bengali theater personality Badal Sarkar.

Filmography
Bhattacharya started his career in Bengali language films in 2015 with Zee Bangla Cinema Originals such as Kader Kuler Bou, Jodi Balo Hyan and Ebhabeo Phire Asa Jay. He hit the big screen in Aparna Sen's Arshinagar in a supporting role. In 2016, he appeared in Arindam Sil's Eagoler Chokh portraying a different character named "Bishan Roy" and was appreciated for his performance. He received the BFJA Most Promising Actor Male award and the Filmfare Awards East for the Best Actor in a Supporting Role for essaying Bishan Roy in that film.

Bhattacharya was awarded with the Best Debutant Actor award at the International Bengali Film Award (IBFA). He played the role of a radio jockey in Colkatay Columbus. He was awarded the Ajeyo Samman 2017 by the newspaper Ebela for becoming the most praised actor in 2016.

Television
Anirban has worked in a non fictional television comedy show Apur Sangsar, along with Saswata Chatterjee, which has started to air on Zee Bangla from 26 January. He has appeared in popular shows of Zee Bangla like Didi No. 1 as guest and Dadagiri Unlimited Season 7 as celebrity contestant. The play Awdyo Shesh Rajni (Anirban as lead) was aired on Home Theatre of Colors Bangla. He hosted a crime show Hushiar Bangla on Colors Bangla.

Anirban has now starred in a limited television series Bhoomikanya (approximately 200 episodes), which is produced by Arindam Sil and has started to air on Star Jalsha. In this series, Anirban has played the role of the male lead "Ankush", who is a fearless and honest forest ranger.

Web series 
Anirban works on the web series Byomkesh, where he portrays the title character, Satyaneshi Byomkesh Bakshi, written by Sharadindu Bandyopadhyay. This brand new web series airs on Hoichoi Originals (a web platform of Shree Venkatesh Films) from 14 October 2017. He has also played the lead role in Laboratory, which is a Hoichoi original film, based on Rabindranath Tagore's famous short story of the same name.

Playback and Voice-over
In 2018, for the first time Anirban has done a playback in his career. The versatile actor has lent his voice for the song "Kichchu Chaini Ami" from the movie Shahjahan Regency, which is directed by Srijit Mukherjee. He has delivered sheer magic in his playback debut and the song has gained immense popularity ever since it was released. The actor who is not a professional singer was stunned and overwhelmed with the response.
He also has lent his voice for the song "Priyotoma" from the movie "Dracula Sir" in 2020. This song is also very beautiful and the audience praised his work.

 Playback-
 "Kichchu Chaini Ami" from  Shahjahan Regency
 "Priyotama" from Dracula Sir
 "Badal Sircar Er Gaan" from Ballabhpurer Roopkotha
 "Bibagi Phone" from Dilkhush
 Voice-over-
 Karnasubarner Guptodhon
 Dilkhush

Awards 
Theatre
 Nirad Baran Memorial Award
 BIG Bangla Rising Star award from BIG FM for the best theatre actor (Male) for the role of Edmund in the drama Raja Lear by Suman Mukhopadhyay.
 Syamal Sen Smriti Samman by theatre group Swapna Sandhani for his dual role in Devi Sarpamasta.
 Sudrak Samman for Best Actor for Devi Sarpamasta.
 Sundaram Samman
 META Award for Excellence in theatre, Best Actor for playing Amiyo in Awdya Shesh Rajani in 2017
 Zee Bangla Gaurab Award for Best Actor for his dual role in Nagamandala in 2014

Film
 WBFJA Awards for Best Promising Actor of The Year in 2017
 Filmfare Awards East for Best Actor in a Supporting Role for playing Bishan Roy in Eagoler Chokh in 2017
 Ajeyo Samman by Ebela newspaper in 2017
 Best Debutant Actor award at International Bengali Film Award (IBFA).
 Bharat Bangladesh Film Awards-(BBFA) for Best Playback Singer( Male) for the song Kichchu Chaini Ami from the movie Shahjahan Regency in 2019
 Telangana Bengali Film Festival(TBFF Aayna)- Best Actor Award for the movie Ghawre Bairey Aaj in 2019 
  WBFJA Awards for Best Playback Singer( Male) for the song Kichchu Chaini Ami from the movie Shahjahan Regency in 2020 
 WBFJA Awards for Best Actor in a Comic Role for the movie Bibaho Obhijaan in 2020
 West Bengal Film Journalists' Association Awards for Best Actor (Popular Choice) for Dwitiyo Purush (film) in 2022
 Filmfare Awards East for Best Actor (Critic's Choice) for Dwitiyo Purush (film) in 2022

OTT
 Hoichoi Awards- Most loved Character for the role of Byomkesh Bakshi from Byomkesh web series in 2020
 Anandalok Awards for Best Director of An Web-Series for Mandaar in 2022
 OTTplay Award for Best Dialogue (Series) for Mandaar in 2022

Others
 ABP Ananda Sera Bangali Award: 2022

References

External links
 

Indian male film actors
Living people
People from Midnapore
Male actors from West Bengal
Indian male stage actors
Rabindra Bharati University alumni
1986 births
Film directors from West Bengal